Jamuhar is a village in the Rohtas district of Bihar, India.

History

Loha Singh and Tara Singh left Fatehpur Sikri in the period of the Mughal emperor Aurangzeb. They were Sikarwar (Sikriwal) Rajputs. They inhabited the village Jamuhar with the help of their family and followers.

Geography and climate

Jamuhar is very fertile flat land. It is drained by the Kai (Cow) river originating in the Kaimur Hills Valley.

Winter months are December and January. April to mid June are the hot months. The monsoon months of June, July, August, and September see good rainfall. October & November and February & March have pleasant climate.

Villages in Jamuhar Panchayat 
Villages within the Jamuhar panchayat include
 Chormara
 Mahdewa
 Jamuhar (and Gopi Bigha)
 Rudarpura
 Tendua Dusadhi

Demographics

Population
Jamuhar has 491 households with a total of 3916 residents.

Education
Jamuhar is served by the Kanya Madhya Vidyalaya middle school and the Jamuhar High School, and is home to several institutions of higher learning:

 The Narayan Medical College and Hospital (NCMH).
 The Institute of Professional Studies (a computer skills training school)
 High School, Jamuhar
 Middle School, Jamuhar
 Gyan Niketan convent school

Religion

Chhath

The celebration of Chhath is a major event of the Jamuhar religious calendar.

The Chhath Pooja in Jamuhar is celebrated on the bank of Canal of Kai River and other Ponds (Talabs).

Places of worship
The temple of Lord Shiva was made by all villagers. There is an old Shiv Ling (Budhwa Shiv Ji) also in the temple compound.  The Kali Mandir is very old. There are many temples in the village.

The Masjid of Jamuhar named "Makkah Madinih Masjid" is under construction.

References

External links

Villages in Rohtas district